The pyramidalis muscle is a small triangular muscle, anterior to the rectus abdominis muscle, and contained in the rectus sheath.

Structure
The pyramidalis muscle is part of the anterior abdominal wall. Inferiorly, the pyramidalis muscle attaches to the pelvis in two places: the pubic symphysis and pubic crest, arising by tendinous fibers from the anterior part of the pubis and the anterior pubic ligament.

Superiorly, the fleshy portion of the pyramidalis muscle passes upward, diminishing in size as it ascends, and ends by a pointed extremity which is inserted into the linea alba, midway between the umbilicus and pubis.

Nerve supply
The pyramidalis muscle is innervated by the ventral portion of T12.

Blood supply
The inferior and superior epigastric arteries supply blood to the pyramidalis muscle.

Variation
The pyramidalis muscle is present in 80% of human population. It may be absent on one or both sides; the lower end of the rectus then becomes proportionately increased in size.

Occasionally, it is doubled on one side, and the muscles of the two sides are sometimes of unequal size. It may also extend higher than the usual level.

Function
The pyramidalis muscle tenses the linea alba when contracting.

Clinical significance
While making the longitudinal incision for a classical caesarean section, the pyramidalis muscle is used to determine midline and location of the linea alba.

Additional images

References

External links
  - "Anterior Abdominal Wall: The Pyramidalis Muscle"
 
 

Muscles of the torso